The Bow Bridge is a cast iron bridge located in Central Park, New York City, crossing over the Lake and used as a pedestrian walkway. 

It is decorated with an interlocking circles banister, with eight planting urns on top of decorative bas-relief panels. Intricate arabesque elements and volutes can be seen underneath the span arch. While other bridges in Central Park are inconspicuous, the Bow Bridge is made to stand out from its surroundings. The Bow Bridge is also the only one of Central Park's seven ornamental iron bridges that does not traverse a bridle path.

The bridge was designed by Calvert Vaux and Jacob Wrey Mould, and completed in 1862. It was built by the Bronx-based iron foundry Janes, Kirtland & Co., the same company that constructed the dome of U.S. Capitol Building. The bridge was restored in 1974.

References

External links 

1862 establishments in New York (state)
Bridges completed in 1862
Bridges in Manhattan
Central Park
Pedestrian bridges in New York City
Iron bridges in the United States
Arch bridges in the United States